Death to the Pixies was the first Pixies best-of compilation, released by 4AD in the UK on October 6, 1997, and 4AD/Elektra the following day in the United States to commemorate the 10th anniversary of the band's debut. It covered the years 1987 to 1991. It is now out of print, having been replaced by the 2004 compilation Wave of Mutilation: Best of Pixies. A limited edition of the compilation also included a second CD with a live performance taken from Vredenburg, Utrecht, Netherlands on September 25, 1990.

There was also another version of the limited edition, produced in extremely small quantities, that includes two rare "Black Francis Demos" ("I'm Amazed" and "Broken Face").  This is known as the "Golden Ticket" version, and has GT appended to its catalog number.  These demos, recorded in the apartment of producer Gary Smith the day before the band convened to record their full demo at Smith's Fort Apache Studios, feature only Francis singing and playing acoustic guitar (and giving notations to Smith about where the other band members' parts are).  The complete "Black Francis Demos" were released as the first disc of 2004's Frank Black Francis 2-CD compilation.

The vinyl release contained all the tracks on the "Golden Ticket" version, spread out over four 10" records.  Featuring a different cover, the vinyl version was a limited edition of 9,000 copies printed.

, sales in the United States have exceeded 148,000 copies, according to Nielsen SoundScan.

Track listing

(limited edition bonus) disc two  
Disc two was recorded 25 September 1990 at Vredenburg in Utrecht, Netherlands and produced by VPRO Radio 3.

"Debaser" – 2:55
"Rock Music" – 1:51
"Broken Face" – 1:21
"Isla de Encanta" – 1:42
"Hangwire" – 2:00
"Dead" – 2:30
"Into the White" – 3:30
"Monkey Gone to Heaven" – 2:58
"Gouge Away" – 2:53
"Here Comes Your Man" – 3:12
"Allison" – 1:16
"Hey" – 3:54
"Gigantic" – 3:26
"Crackity Jones" – 1:35
"Something Against You" – 1:46
"Tame" – 2:05
"Wave of Mutilation" – 3:05
"Where Is My Mind?" – 3:37
"Ed Is Dead" – 2:52
"Vamos" – 4:34
"Tony's Theme" – 2:27

Disc two is missing 13 songs from the complete concert. Here is the 25th September 1990 concert setlist at Muziekcentrum Vredenburg in Utrecht, Netherlands.

 Cecilia Ann
 Levitate Me
 Debaser
 Rock Music
 Hangwire
 Dead
 There Goes My Gun
 Monkey Gone to Heaven
 Isla de Encanta
 Velouria
 Into the White
 Stormy Weather
 Hey
 Gigantic
 Crackity Jones
 Dig for Fire
 Dancing the Manta Ray
 Gouge Away
 Here Comes Your Man
 Caribou
 All Over the World
 Allison
 The Happening
 Broken Face
 I Bleed
 Something Against You
 Tame
 Is She Weird
 Wave of Mutilation (UK Surf)
 Where Is My Mind
 Ed Is Dead
 Vamos
 Tony's Theme
 Wave of Mutilation

Bootleg
An unofficial alternative vinyl LP titled Death to the Pixies was recorded at the Crystal Palace Bowl Saturday 8 June 1991.

vinyl side one
"The Happening"
"Allison"
"Velouria"
"Hang Wire"
"Debaser"
"Letter to Memphis"
"Planet of Sound"
"Blown Away"

vinyl side two
"Here Comes Your Man"
"Where Is My Mind?"
"The Holiday Song"
"Break my Body"
"Motorway to Roswell"
"Vamos"
"Head On" (The Jesus and Mary Chain cover)

Charts

Weekly charts

Year-end charts

References

External links
Death to the Pixies at PixieMusic

1997 greatest hits albums
Albums produced by Gary Smith (record producer)
Albums produced by Gil Norton
Albums produced by Steve Albini
Pixies (band) compilation albums
Pixies (band) live albums
4AD compilation albums